Będargowo may refer to the following places:
Będargowo, Pomeranian Voivodeship (north Poland)
Będargowo, Choszczno County in West Pomeranian Voivodeship (north-west Poland)
Będargowo, Police County in West Pomeranian Voivodeship (north-west Poland)